Curtis Fowlkes (born March 19, 1950) is an American jazz trombonist and singer. He is a founding member of The Jazz Passengers.

Career
In 1987, Fowlkes started The Jazz Passengers with saxophonist Roy Nathanson.  He has also been a member of The Lounge Lizards, the Kansas City All-Stars, and a quartet led by jazz guitarist Bill Frisell. He has toured with Charlie Haden's Liberation Orchestra and the Duke Ellington Orchestra when it was led by drummer Louis Bellson. He released his debut solo album in 1999.

Discography

As leader
 Reflect (Knitting Factory, 1999)

With The Jazz Passengers
 Implement Yourself (New World/CounterCurrents 1990)
 Live at the Knitting Factory (Knitting Factory, 1991)
 Plain Old Joe (Knitting Factory, 1993)
 In Love (High Street, 1994)
 Individually Twisted (32 Records, 1996)
 Re-United (Justin Time, 2010)
 Still Life with Trouble (Thirsty Ear, 2017)

With The Lounge Lizards
 Big Heart: Live in Tokyo (Island, 1986) 
 No Pain for Cakes (Island, 1987)
 Voice of Chunk (Lagarto, 1988)

As sideman
With Don Byron
 Nu Blaxploitation (Capitol, 1998)
 You Are #6 (Blue Note, 2001)
 Do the Boomerang (Blue Note, 2006)

With Bill Frisell
 Quartet (Nonesuch, 1996)
 This Land (Elektra Nonesuch, 1994)
 Blues Dream (Nonesuch, 2001)
 Unspeakable (Nonesuch, 2004)

With Glen Hansard
 Didn't He Ramble (Anti-, 2015)
 A Season On the Line (Anti-, 2016)
 Between Two Shores (Anti-, 2018)
 This Wild Willing (Anti-, 2019)

With Charlie Hunter
 Right Now Move (Ropeadope, 2003)
 Baboon Strength (Spire Artist 2008)
 Gentlemen I Neglected to Inform You You Will Not Be Getting Paid (Spire Artist 2010)
 Let the Bells Ring On (Charlie Hunter, 2015)
 We Two Kings (Rank Hypocri$i, 2015)
 Everybody Has a Plan Until They Get Punched in the Mouth (GroundUP, 2016)

With John Lurie
 Stranger Than Paradise and the Resurrection of Albert Ayler (Attitude/Crammed Discs 1985)
 Down by Law (Made to Measure/Crammed Discs 1987)
 Excess Baggage (Prophecy, 1997)

With Roy Nathanson
 Broken Night Red Light with Roy Nathanson, (Crepuscule, 1988)
 Deranged and Decomposed with Roy Nathanson (Crepuscule, 1988)
 Camp Stories (Knitting Factory, 1996)
 Fire at Keaton's Bar & Grill (Six Degrees, 2000)
 Sotto Voce (AUM Fidelity, 2006)
 Subway Moon (Yellowbird, 2009)
 Nearness and You (Clean Feed, 2016)
 Complicated Day (Yellowbird/Enja, 2014)

With Marc Ribot
YRU Still Here? (Northern Spy, 2018)
 Rootless Cosmopolitans (Island, 1990)
 Shoe String Symphonettes (Tzadik, 1997)

With Elliott Sharp
 Forgery (Intuition, 2007)
 Spectropia Suite (NEOS, 2010)
 Sky Road Songs (Yellowbird, 2012)

With others
 Horace Andy, Fresh (Island in the Sun 1987)
 Eszter Balint, Flicker (Scratchie, 1998)
 Samm Bennett, The Big Off (Factory Outlet 1993)
 Steven Bernstein, MTO Plays Sly (Royal Potato Family 2011)
 Brass Construction, Brass Construction II (United Artists, 1976)
 Henry Butler, Viper's Drag (Impulse!, 2014)
 Thomas Chapin, Insomnia (Knitting Factory, 1993)
 Elvis Costello The Sweetest Punch (Decca, 1999)
 Elvis Costello, When I Was Cruel (Island, 2002)
 Sheryl Crow, Sheryl Crow (A&M 1996)
 Will Downing, Moods (Mercury 1995)
 Marty Ehrlich, A Trumpet in the Morning (New World, 2013)
 Oran Etkin, Wake Up Clarinet! (Timbalooloo 2010)
 Oran Etkin, Gathering Light (Motema, 2014)
 Charlie Haden, Not in Our Name (Verve, 2005)
 Charlie Haden, Time/Life (Impulse!, 2016)
 Gunter Hampel, Fresh Heat: Live at Sweet Basil (Birth, 1985)
 Joel Harrison, Infinite Possibility (Sunnyside, 2013)
 Levon Helm, It's Showtime (Vanguard, 2014)
 Paul Hemmings, The Blues and the Abstract (Uke Leading Tone 2015)
 Colm Mac Con Iomaire, And Now the Weather (Plateau, 2015)
 Iron and Wine, Ghost On Ghost (Nonesuch, 2013)
 Freedy Johnston, Blue Days Black Nights (Elektra, 1999)
 Brad Jones, Uncivilized Poise (Knitting Factory, 1999)
 King Short Shirt, Press On (A&B, 1979)
 Billy Martin, Heels Over Head (Amulet, 2013)
 Cibo Matto, Super Relax (Warner Bros., 1997)
 Bobby Previte, Counterclockwise (Palmetto, 2003)
 Jeb Loy Nichols, As the Rain (Capitol, 1997)
 Jeb Loy Nichols, Lovers Knot (Capitol, 1997)
 Lou Reed, Berlin (Lumiere, 2008)
 Lou Reed, Berlin: Live at St. Ann's Warehouse (Matador/Sister Ray 2008)
 Max Romeo, Freedom Street (Island in the Sun 1984)
 Harry Shearer, It Must Have Been Something I Said (Rhino, 1994)
 Andy Summers, Peggy's Blue Skylight (BMG, 2000)
 Henry Threadgill, Spirit of Nuff...Nuff (Black Saint, 1991)
 Kazutoki Umezu, Eclecticism (Knitting Factory, 1993)
 Dan Zanes, Catch That Train (Festival Five, 2006)
 John Zorn, John Zorn's Cobra Live at the Knitting Factory (Knitting Factory, 1995)

References

External links
Curtis Fowlkes biography

American jazz trombonists
Male trombonists
Living people
Fowlkes, Curtis
Place of birth missing (living people)
21st-century trombonists
21st-century American male musicians
American male jazz musicians
The Lounge Lizards members
The Jazz Passengers members
Groove Collective members